Jacques Jacobus "Vleis" Engelbrecht (born 10 June 1985) is a South African professional rugby union player, currently playing in France with French Pro D2 side Montauban. He can play as a flanker or a number eight.

Career

Youth / amateur rugby / Western Province

Engelbrecht played high school rugby for Monument Park High School, where he played as a flanker for their first team in 2002 and 2003. He represented  in the 2005 Under-21 Provincial Championship and played club rugby for Hamiltons in the Western Province Super League.

SWD Eagles

He made three starts and five appearances off the bench in the competition as the Eagles finished third on the log to qualify for the semi-finals.

Engelbrecht featured in a compulsory friendly match against the  before making ten appearances in the 2009 Currie Cup First Division. The SWD Eagles finished the round-robin stage of the competition in second position on the log to qualify for the semi-finals. They lost 42–47 in the first leg in Potchefstroom and an 18–17 victory in the second leg was not enough to get the SWD Eagles promoted.

By 2010, Engelbrecht had established himself as a first-team regular and started six of their seven matches in the 2010 Vodacom Cup, but his side had a poor season compared to 2009 and failed to qualify for the quarter finals, winning just two of their matches in the competition. He played in a compulsory friendly match against  in Oudtshoorn and featured in all ten matches during the regular season of the 2010 Currie Cup First Division, starting nine of those. The SWD Eagles had a far more successful season than their Vodacom Cup campaign and finished top of the log to qualify for the semi-finals with home advantage. In addition to losing in the final for the second consecutive year, the SWD Eagles also failed to win promotion for the season year in a row.

His performances during the course of the season led to him being nominated as the First Division Player of the Season, although the award was eventually won by  winger Norman Nelson.

South African Sevens

Shortly after the Currie Cup season finished, Engelbrecht was included in the South Africa Sevens squad that played in the 2010 South Africa Sevens tournament, where they won the Plate tournament. This turned out to be his only selection in the Blitzbokke squad.

Eastern Province Kings / Kings

The Eastern Province Kings won six of their eight matches in the competition, but missed out on a quarter final spot after they were deducted nine points for fielding ineligible players in their matches.

In June 2011, Engelbrecht was included in a South African Kings side that participated at the 2011 IRB Nations Cup in Romania. The South African Kings was the name used by the Southern Kings franchise, as part of their preparations for their inclusion into Super Rugby in 2013. Engelbrecht started their first two matches as the Kings beat  31–17 and hosts  27–23.

Engelbrecht featured in a compulsory friendly match against the  before making nine appearances in the 2011 Currie Cup First Division. They ran out 48–17 winners in the semi-final with Engelbrecht scoring a first-half try. He also played in the final, but ended on the losing side for the third year in succession, as Wellington-based outfit  ran out 43–12 winners.

Prior to the 2012 Currie Cup First Division, Engelbrecht featured in two more first class matches; the first was a match for a South African Barbarians (South) side against  during their 2012 tour of South Africa which saw Engelbrecht score the opening try in a 26–54 defeat for the Barbarians, while his second match was for the Eastern Province Kings in a 36–19 victory against a South African Students side.

In his absence, the Eastern Province Kings went on to clinch the First Division title, beating the  26–25 in the final.

Engelbrecht returned to action in 2013, when he was named in the  squad for the 2013 Super Rugby season. He eventually made fifteen appearances in the competition – ten starts and five appearances off the bench – during the competition as the Kings finished last on the log.

Blue Bulls / Bulls

He made eight appearances for the Blue Bulls during the 2013 Currie Cup Premier Division – the first time he played in the Premier Division of the Currie Cup since his 2007 cameo appearance for  – as they finished in fifth spot to miss out on the title play-offs.

He also made a single appearance for the Blue Bulls in the 2014 Vodacom Cup.

Despite being named in the  squad for the 2015 Super Rugby season, Engelbrecht failed to make any appearances in the competition, instead making six starts for the Blue Bulls in the 2015 Vodacom Cup competition.

Eastern Province Kings (loan)

He made one appearance as a replacement and three starts in the remainder of the competition, helping the Eastern Province Kings improve on their 2014 record by winning two matches to finish in seventh position in the eight-team league.

Southern Kings (2016)

He started their first four matches of the season in the number eight shirt, but lost his starting place to Aidon Davis who returned from an injury lay-off. In total, he made five starts and five appearances as a replacement during the season, without scoring a try in a season that saw the Kings finish bottom of the South African Group and second-last overall, winning just two matches.

Boland Cavaliers

Montauban

After the 2016 Currie Cup Premier Division season, Engelbrecht moved to France, joining Pro D2 side Montauban on a two-year contract.

Sporting Club Albigeois
After briefly appearing in four matches for French side Mâcon in 2020, Engelbrecht signed for Championnat Fédéral Nationale side Sporting Club Albigeois in February 2021

Statistics

References

1985 births
Living people
Blue Bulls players
Bulls (rugby union) players
Eastern Province Elephants players
Rugby union number eights
Rugby union players from Bellville, South Africa
South Africa international rugby sevens players
South African rugby union players
Southern Kings players
Western Province (rugby union) players